Bestwig is a municipality in the Hochsauerland district, in North Rhine-Westphalia, Germany.

Geography
Bestwig is situated on the river Ruhr, approx. 10 km east of Meschede. It lies on the German Autobahn A 46. Bestwig has a railway station, connecting the town through local trains to Dortmund Hauptbahnhof, Winterberg and Hagen Hauptbahnhof.

Neighbouring municipalities
 Olsberg
 Schmallenberg
 Meschede
 Rüthen
 Warstein

Subdivisions
Since 2009, the municipality is officially divided into 6 so-called Ortschaften, each containing of one to five villages (Ortsteile).

 Economy 
Bestwig, surrounded by many acres of pine tree forests, is a centre of Christmas tree production.

Tourism, however, is the most important source of income. The Sauerland forests are popular among hikers and, in winter, skiing is possible.

Twin towns
Bestwig has no official partnership with another town, but has close to ties to Niederorschel (Thuringia, Germany) and Niederwiesa (Saxony, Germany).

Coat of arms
The coat of arms shows a silver Saint Andrew's Cross on blue ground.
The Saint Andrew's Cross is a reference to the patron of the parish church in Velmede, Saint Andrew. The colors silver and blue show the allegiance to the former county of Arnsberg.

Notable natives
 Franz Hoffmeister (1898-1943), Roman Catholic priest
 Theo Bücker (born 1948), coach of Lebanon's national football team
 Wilhelmine Lübke (1885–1981), First Lady
 Ferdinand von Lüninck (born 1888), German nobleman (a Freiherr i.e. a Baron) Roman Catholic, who participated in plans to overthrow Hitler on 20 July 1944. Arrested after plot failed and sentenced to death. Hanged on 14 November 1944.
 Hedwig von Beverfoerde (born 1963), German noblewoman, right-wing political activist and Traditional Catholic

Notable places in Bestwig

 Wasserfall'' is named after its famous waterfall, a popular sight during walking tours. It is one of the largest cascades in North Rhine-Westphalia.
Bergkloster Monastery, the motherhouse of the European Province of the Sisters of St Maria Magdalena Postel

References

External links 

 Official site 

Hochsauerlandkreis